Seboeis Lake extends from Lake View Plantation, Maine, north into Maine township 4, range 9. The lake is enclosed by rocky headlands and sandy beaches and contains several pine-covered islands. The inlet at the north end receives several tributaries from Long A township including Dean Brook, Jordan Brook, and West Seboeis Stream. Bear Brook flows into the northwest corner of the lake, and Northwest Pond overflows into the west side of the Lake.

Fishing
A boat launching area on the inlet can be reached from a side road at West Seboeis on Maine State Route 11. The lake provides good habitat for white perch, chain pickerel, and smallmouth bass; and a few brook trout move into the lake from the tributaries. A dam at the outlet prevents anadromous fish migration into the lake.

Sources

Lakes of Piscataquis County, Maine
North Maine Woods
Penobscot River
Reservoirs in Maine